The Cut is a Canadian short film, directed by Geneviève Dulude-De Celles and released in 2014. The film stars Milya Corbeil-Gauvreau as Fanny, a young girl whose relationship with her father Yves (Alain Houle) is explored when her offer to cut his hair is interrupted by external events.

Accolades
The film won the Short Film Jury Award for International Fiction at the 2014 Sundance Film Festival. At the 2014 Vancouver International Film Festival, Dulude-De Celles won the award for most promising director of a Canadian short film.

The film was named to the Toronto International Film Festival's year-end Canada's Top Ten list for 2014, and received a Canadian Screen Award nomination for Best Live Action Short Drama at the 3rd Canadian Screen Awards.

References

External links
 

2014 short films
2014 films
2014 drama films
Films directed by Geneviève Dulude-De Celles
French-language Canadian films
Canadian drama short films
2010s Canadian films